This is a list of television programmes that are either currently being broadcast or have previously been broadcast on ITV in the United Kingdom.



Currently broadcast
Shows broadcast on ITV as of winter 2021:

The Larkins
The Real Full Monty
Bradley and Barney Walsh: Breaking Dad
All Star Musicals
The Jonathan Ross Show
Paul O’Grady: For the Love of Dogs
The Voice Kids
The Voice UK
Spitting Image (Specials only)
The Chase
The Cube
Rolling in It
Tipping Point
Celebrity Catchphrase
Family Fortunes
In for A Penny
Paul O’Grady’s Saturday Night Line Up
Coronation Street
Emmerdale

Other programmes

0–9

1000 Heartbeats (2015–2016)
The 10 Percenters (1994–1996)
2DTV (2001–2004)
The 21st Question (2014)
24 Hour Quiz (2004)
24 Hours with... (2007)
3@Three (2010)
3-2-1 (1978–1988)
3-2-1 Penguins! (2000–2008)
5 Gold Rings (2017–2020)
500 Questions (2016)
60 Minute Makeover (2004–2014) 
The $64,000 Question (1956–1958, 1990–1993)
71 Degrees North (2010–2011)

A

 All Star Mr & Mrs (2008–2016)
All Star Family Fortunes (2006–2015) 
Alphabetical (2016–2017)
Above Suspicion (2009–2012)
The Adventurer (1972–1973)
The Adventures of Ellery Queen (1955–1956)
The Adventures of the Scarlet Pimpernel (1956)
The Adventures of Sherlock Holmes (1984–1994)
The Adventures of Sir Lancelot (1956–1957)
The Adventures of Twizzle (1957–1959)
The Adventures of William Tell (1958–1959)
Agatha Christie's Marple (2004–2013)
Agatha Christie's Poirot (1989–2013)
American Dad! (2016–present)
Alan Carr's Epic Gameshow (2020–present)
The Alan Titchmarsh Show (2007–2014)
Ant & Dec's DNA Journey (2019)
Ant & Dec's Limitless Win (2022–present)
Ant & Dec's Push the Button (2010–2011)
Ant & Dec's Saturday Night Takeaway (2002–2009, 2013–2018, 2020-present)
Auf Wiedersehen, Pet (ITV 1983–1986, BBC One 2002–2004)
The Avengers (1961–1969)

B

BBQ Champ (2015)
Babushka (2017)
Bad Girls (ITV 1999–2006; repeated on ITV2 & ITV3 from (2010–2014))
Bad Move (ITV 2017)
Band of Gold (1995–1997)
Barbara (1995–2003, still repeated on ITV3)
Barney & Friends (1992–2010)
The Baron (1966–1967)
The Beachcomber (1962)
Beadle's About (1986–1996)
Bordertown (2016) 
Beat the Chasers (2020–present)
Benidorm (2007–2018) 
The Benny Hill Show (BBC TV/ BBC One 1955–1968, ITV/Thames 1969–1989)
Big Brother (Channel 4 2000–2010, Channel 5 2011–2018, ITV2 Revival 2023)
Bigheads (2017)
The Big Match (1968–1992, ITV4 2008–present as The Big Match Revisited)
The Bill (1983, 1984–2010, repeated on Drama)
Birds of a Feather (BBC One 1989–1998, ITV 2014–2020)
A Bit of a Do (1989)
Blankety Blank (BBC One 1979–1990 & 1997–1999, ITV 2001–2003)
Billy Connolly: Journey to the Edge of the World (2009)
Blind Date (1985–2003, Channel 5 2017–2019)
Blockbusters (ITV 1983–1993, Sky One 1994, BBC 1997, Challenge 2012)
Bonkers (2007)
Born to Shine (2011)
Brideshead Revisited (1981)
Britain's Best Dish (2007–2011)
Britain's Brainiest Kid (2001–2002)
Britains Brightest Celebrity Family (2020)
Britain's Brightest Family (2018–present)
Britain's Got More Talent (2007-2019)
Britain's Got Talent (2007–2020, 2022–present)
Britain's Got Talent: The Champions (2019)
Britannia High (2008)
Broadchurch (2013–2017)
The Buccaneers (1956–1957)
Bullseye (1981–1995, revived on Challenge 2006, later revived for Gameshow Marathon 2005–2007 and Alan Carr's Epic Gameshow 2020)

C

Cannonball (1958–1959)
Cannonball (2017)
Capstick's Law (1989)
Captain Scarlet and the Mysterons (1967–1968, later repeated on BBC Two 1993–2008)
Captain Star (1997–1998)
Cash Cab UK (2005–2006)
Cash Trapped (2016–2019)
Catchphrase (1986–2002, 2013–present)
Celebrity (2000)
Celebrity Juice (ITV2 2008–2022)
Celebrity Squares (1975-1979, 1993–1997, 2014–15)
Chain Letters (1987–1997)
Challenge Anneka (BBC One 1987–1995, ITV 2006–2007)
The Champions (1968–1969)
The Chase (2009–present)
The Chase: Celebrity Special (2011–present) 
Cilla (2014)
CITV (the block in ITV Breakfast; CITV got its own channel.) (CITV Weekday Block on ITV: 1983–2007, Weekend CITV 1983–present, CITV Channel 2006–present)
The Cleveland Show (2016–present)
Colonel March of Scotland Yard (1956–1957)
The Colour of Money (2009) 
Coming Home  (1998)
Coronation Street (1960–present)
The Count of Monte Cristo (1956)
A Country Practice (various ITV regions between 1982 and 1999)
Countrywise (2009–present)
Court Martial (1966)
Cracker (1993–1996 & 2006)
The Cook Report (1987–1999)
The Crezz (1976)
Crossroads (1964–1988 & 2001–2003)
The Cube  (2009-2015, 2020–present & revived as The Million Pound Cube in 2020)
Culinary Genius (2017)
Curry and Chips (1969)

D

Dance Dance Dance (2017)
The Dance Years (2001)
Dancing on Ice (2006–2014, 2018–present)
Dancing on Ice at Christmas (2019)
Danger Man (1960–1968)
Danger Mouse (ITV 1981–1992, BBC Two 2007–2009, CBBC 2015–present)
Danger UXB (1979)
The Darling Buds of May (1991–1993)
Dave Spud: the Movie (2022 as a movie)
Daybreak (1983, 2010–2014)
Deal or No Deal (Channel 4 2005-2016, ITV1 2023)
Demons (2009)
Department S (1969–1970)
The Des O'Connor Show (1963–1973)
Des O'Connor Tonight (BBC Two 1977–1982, ITV 1983–1999 & 2001–2002)
Dickinson's Real Deal (2006–present)
Dinosaur Britain (2015)
Doc Martin (2004–present, repeated on ITV3)
Doctor Finlay (1993–1996)
Don't Ask Me Ask Britain (2017)
Don't Drink the Water (1974–1975)
Downton Abbey (2010–2015)
Duel (2008)
The Durrells (2016–2019)
Duty Free (1984–1986, repeated on ITV3)

E

Echo Beach (2008)
Edward & Mrs. Simpson (1978)
Eleventh Hour (2006)
Emergency – Ward 10 (1957–1967)
Emmerdale (originated from ITV Yorkshire) (1972–present)
Endeavour (2012–present)
 IBA Engineering Announcements (moved to Channel 4)
Espionage (1963–1964)
Eternal Law (2012)
Everybody's Equal (1989–1991)
Executive Stress (1986-1988)
The Exit List (2012)

F

The Family Chase (2017–present)
Family Fortunes (1980–2002, 2020–)
Family Guy (2016–present)
The Famous Five (1978–1979)
Ffizz (1987–1989)
Fierce (2016)
Fireball XL5 (1978–1979)
Food Glorious Food (2013)
Footballers' Wives (2002–2006)
Freeze Out (2015)
The Forsyte Saga (2002)
Four Feather Falls (1960)
The Four Just Men (1959–1960)
Foyle's War (2002–2015)
Fraggle Rock (UK Version, 1984–1990)
From a Bird's Eye View (1970–1971)

G

The Gaffer (1981–1983)
Game for a Laugh (ITV 1981–1985)
Game of Talents (2021)
The Gay Cavalier (1957)
General Hospital (1972–1979)
George and Mildred (1976–1979)
Geronimo Stilton (1982-1987)
Gerry Anderson's New Captain Scarlet (ITV & CITV 2005–2006)
Get a Grip (2007)
Get Lost! (1981)
Get Real (1998)
Ghost Squad (1961–1964)
Gideon's Way (1965–1966)
Give Us A Clue (ITV 1979–1992, BBC One 1997)
Gladiators (ITV 1992–2000, Sky One 2008–2009)
Glitterball (2007)
Golden Balls (2007–2009)
The Golden Shot (1967–1975, later revived for Gameshow Marathon 2005–2007)
Good Evening Britain (2018)
Good Morning Britain (ITV 1984–1993, 2014–present)
Good Morning Britain With Lorraine (2020)
The Goodies (BBC Two 1970–1980, ITV 1981–1982)
The Good Karma Hospital (2017–present)
Gordon, Gino and Fred: Road Trip (2019–present)
Grimefighters (2009–2012)
The Grimleys (1999–2001)
Grundy's Northern Pride (2007–2008)

H

The Halcyon (2017)
Harry Hill's TV Burp (2002–2012) (repeats on Gold)
Harry Hill's Alien Fun Capsule (2017–2019)
Heartbeat (1992–2010, still repeated on ITV3)
Heathrow: Britain's Busiest Airport (2015–present)
Hell's Kitchen (2004–2009)
Home and Away (ITV 1989–2000, Channel 5 2001–present)
Homefront (2012)
The Hot Desk (2007–2017) ITV2
Hot Metal (1986–1989)
Hot Money (2001)
House Gift (2009–2011)
House Guest (2008)

I

I'm a Celebrity: Extra Camp (ITV2 2002–2019) 
I'm a Celebrity...Get Me Out of Here! (ITV & ITV2 2002–present)
In For A Christmas Penny (2019–present)
In For A Penny (2019–present)
The Informer (1966–1967)
Interceptor (1989–1990)
Interpol Calling (1959–1960)
It'll Be Alright on the Night (1977–present)
The Invisible Man (1958)
ITV News (1955–present)
ITV Nightscreen (1998-2021)
ITV Sport (ITV 1965–present, ITV4 2005–present)
The ITV Telethons (ITV 1988–1992)
Ivanhoe (ITV 1958–1959)

J

Jackpot247 (2011–2019)
James Bond Jr. (1991)
Jason King (1971–1972)
Jeopardy! (Channel 4 1983-1984, ITV 1990–1993, Sky One 1995-1996, ITV1 2023)
Jeeves and Wooster (1990–1993)  
The Jeremy Kyle Show (2005–2019) 
Japandemonium (2018)
Jericho (2005)
Jesus of Nazareth (1977)
The Jewel in the Crown (1984)
The Job Lot (ITV 2013, ITV2 2014–2015)
Joe 90 (1968–1969, repeated on BBC One 1994)
Jonathan Dimbleby (1994-2005)
The Jonathan Ross Show (2011–present)
Judge Rinder (2014–present)
The Julie Andrews Hour (1972–1973)

K

Kate & Koji (2020–present)
Keith Lemon's Lemonaid (2012)
Keith Lemon's Very Brilliant World Tour (2008)
Keynotes (1989–1992)
Kinvig (1981)
The Kit Curran Radio Show (1984–1986)
The Krypton Factor (1977–1995 & 2009–2010)

L

The Labours of Erica (1989–1990)
Ladette to Lady (2005–2010)
Lavender Castle (1999–2000)
Lemon La Vida Loca (2012–2013)
 Let's Do Lunch with Gino & Mel (2011-2014)
Little Big Shots (2017–present)
Little Boy Blue (2017)
London Bridge (1996–1999, only available in London region)
London's Burning (1986–2002)
Long Lost Family (2011–present)
Loose Women (1999–present)
Lorraine (2010–present, from 1987 to 1992 & 1993–2010; Lorraine Kelly worked for TVAM & GMTV on a number of shows)
Lost in Austen (2008)
Love Island  (2005–2006)
Love Island (2015–present)
Lucky Ladders (1988–1993)

M

Madeline (1991)
Magic Numbers (2010)
Man in a Suitcase (1967–1968)
Man of the World (1962–1963)
Marcella (2016–2020)
The Masked Dancer (2021–present)
The Masked Singer (2020–present)
May The Best House Win (2010–2013)
Men Behaving Badly (ITV 1991–1992, BBC 1993–1998)
Midsomer Murders (1997–present)
Minder (1979–1994, Channel 5 2009)
Moneyball (2021)
Monkey Trousers (2005)
Monroe (2011–2012)
Morecambe & Wise (ATV 1961–1968, BBC 1968–1977, Thames/ITV 1978–1983)
Motormouth (1988–1992)
The Moment of Truth (1998–2001)
The Movie Show on ITV2 (2011)
Mr. Bean (1990–1995; Thames 1990–1993, Central 1993–1995)
Mr Selfridge (2013–2016)
Munch Bunch 
The Muppet Show (1976–1981)
Murder, She Wrote (originally shown on ITV, repeated on BBC, ITV 2011–present)

N

Name That Tune (ITV 1976–1988, Channel 5 1997–1998, revived for Alan Carr's Epic Gameshow 2021)
Nearest and Dearest (1968-1973)
Network First (1994-1997)
Never the Twain (1981-1991)
The New Avengers (1976-1977)
New Faces (1973-1978 & 1986–1988) 
The New Statesman
News Knight with Sir Trevor McDonald (2007)
Newzoids (2015–2016)
The Next Great Magician (2016)
Next Level Chef UK (2023)
Ninja Warrior UK (2015–present)
The Nightly Show (2017)
Night Shift (1992-1998)
Nightwatch with Steve Scott (2008-2010)
No Heroics (2008)
The Noise (1996)
Northanger Abbey (2007)
Not with a Bang (1990)

O

O.S.S. (1957–1958)
Odd Man Out (1977)
Odd One In (2010–2011)
Oh, Mr. Toad (1990)
Oliver Twist (1999)
On the Buses (1969–1973)
The Only Way Is Essex (ITV2 2010–2014, ITVBe 2014–present)
Only When I Laugh (1979–1982)
Opportunity Knocks (ITV 1956–1978, BBC One 1987–1990)
Orson Welles' Great Mysteries (1973–1974)
Out of Step (1957)

P

P.O.W (2003)
The Palace (2008)
The Paper Lads (1977-1979)
Parkinson (BBC One 1971-1982 & 1998–2004, ITV 2004–2007)
The Passions of Girls Aloud (2008)
Password 
Paul O'Grady: Animal Orphans (2014-2016)
Paul O'Grady: For the Love of Dogs (2012–present)
Paul O'Grady: For the Love of Dogs at Christmas (2012–present)
Paul O'Grady: For the Love of Dogs - India (2018)
Paul O'Grady Live (2010–2011)
Paul O'Grady's Saturday Night Line-up (2021)
The Paul O'Grady Show (ITV 2004-2006 & 2013–2015, Channel 4 2006–2009)
Penn & Teller: Fool Us (2011)
The People Versus (2000–2001)
The Persuaders! (1971–1972)
Peter Andre: The Next Chapter (2009–2013)
Piers Morgan's Life Stories (2009–present)
The Piglet Files (1990–1992)
The Planet's Funniest Animals (ITV & ITV2 1999–2008)
Play to the Whistle (2015–2017)
Play with Me Sesame (2002-2007)
Play Your Cards Right (1980–1987, 1994–1999 & 2001–2003, revived for Alan Carr's Epic Gameshow 2020)
Please Sir! (1968–1972)
Pokémon (1999-2004)
Police Camera Action! (ITV & ITV4 1994–2010)
Pop Idol ITV & ITV2 (2001–2003)
Popstar to Operastar (2010–2011)
Prehistoric Park (2006)
Press Gang (1989–1993)
The Price Is Right (ITV 1984–1988, 1995–2001 & 2006–2007, Sky One 1989–1991, revived for Alan Carr's Epic Gameshow 2020)
Primeval (2007–2011, Watch 2011)
Prisoner: Cell Block H (on various ITV regions between 1984 and 1999; later on Channel 5 from 1997 to 2001)
The Prisoner (1967–1968, remake 2009)
The Professionals (1977–1983)
The Protectors (1972–1974)

Q

Quatermass (1979)
Quantum Leap (2004-2008)
Quayside (1997)
Queenie's Castle (1970-1972)
Quiet as a Nun (1978)
Quincy ME (2003-2009) 
Quiz (2020)
Quizmania (2005-2007)
Quizmaster (2019)

R

Rainbow (1972-1991, 1994–1996)
Randall and Hopkirk (Deceased) (1969-1970, revived on BBC One with Vic Reeves & Bob Mortimer 2000–2001)
Real Prison Breaks
Red Heat
Red or Black? (2011-2012)
Return of the Saint (1978-1979)
Richard Bacon's Beer & Pizza Club (ITV4 2010–2011)
Riddiculous (2022-)
Rising Damp (1974-1978, repeated on ITV3)
Robin of Sherwood (1984-1986)
The Rockford Files (BBC One 1970–1997,2000-2006 ITV 1997-2000 Granada Plus 2002-2004 BBC Two 2000-2006 ITV 2006-2010 repeated on ITV3)
Rolling In It (2020)
The Royal (2003-2011, still repeated on ITV3)
The Ruffy-Tuff Show (2015–present; spinoff version of Saturday Night Takeaway)
Russian Roulette (2002-2003)

S

The Saint (1962-1969)
Saint & Greavsie (1985-1992)
Samurai Pizza Cats
Sale of the Century (ITV 1971–1983, Sky One 1989–1991, Challenge 1997–1998)
Sapphire & Steel (1979-1982)
Scott & Bailey (2011–2016)
Seaway (1965-1966)
The Second Coming (2003) Show Me What You've Got 2008
The Secret Service (1969)
The Sentimental Agent (1963)
Sesame Street (1969–present)
Shillingbury Tales (1980-1981)
Shirley's World (1972)
Shortland Street
Show Me The Funny (2011)
Sing If You Can (2011)
Sir Francis Drake (1961-1962)
Sitting On A Fortune (2021)
Small Fortune (2019)
 Soapstars (2001)
Soapstar Superstar (2006-2007)
Sons and Daughters (on various ITV regions between 1983 and 1995; UK Gold: 1992 to 1996; Channel 5: 1998 to 2005)
South by South East (1991)
Space: 1999 (1975-1977)
Space Patrol (1963-1964)
Space Precinct (2004-2010)
Spin Star (2008) Show Me What You've Got 2008
Spitting Image (1984-1996)
Splash! (2013–14)
SpongeBob SquarePants (from Nickelodeon, shown on CITV)
Squeak! (2003-2008; shown on CITV)
Stars In Their Eyes (1990-2006, 2015) 
Starstruck (2022–present)
Star Wars films (1977-2005, 2015–present)
Stay Lucky (1989-1993)
Staying Alive (1996-1997)
Stepping Out (2013)
Stingray (1964-1965, repeated on BBC Two 1990s-2000s)
Strange Report (1969-1970)
Strike It Lucky (1986-1994, revived for Alan Carr's Epic Gameshow 2020)
Strike It Rich (1996-1999)
Supercar (1961-1962)
Supermarket Sweep (ITV 1993–2001, 2007 & 2020, ITV2 2019)
Surprise Surprise (1984–2001, 2012–2015)
Survivor (2001-2002)
The Suspect (2022)
The Sweeney (1975-1978)
Sword of Freedom (1958-1961)
 
Show Me What You've Got (2006)

T

Tales from the Crypt
Take Me Out (2010–2020)
Take The High Road (1980-2003)
Take Your Pick (1955–1968 & 1992–1998, revived for Alan Carr's Epic Gameshow 2020)
Tales of the Unexpected (1979–1988)
Talking Telephone Numbers (1994–1997)
Tell Me Everything (2022)
Tenable (2016–present)
Tenable All Stars (2019–present)
Terrahawks (1983-1986)
Thank God You're Here (2008)
That Sunday Night Show (2010–2011)
That's Love (1988-1992)
The Thief, His Wife and the Canoe (2022)
This Is Tom Jones (1969–1971)
This Morning (1988–present)
Thomas the Tank Engine (1984-1992, 2003–2006)
Through the Keyhole (ITV 1987–1995 & 2013–present, Sky One 1996, BBC 1997–2008)
Thunderbirds (ITV 1965–1966, BBC Two 1991–2009, 2014–present)
The Tomorrow People (1973–1979, revival 1992–1995)
Tipping Point (2012–present)
Tonight (1999–present)
Torchy the Battery Boy (1960-1961)
Total Emergency (2009)
A Touch of Frost (1992–2010, still repeated on ITV & ITV3)
Tripper's Day (1984)
The Trisha Show (ITV 1999–2004, Channel 5 2005–2009)
The Two of Us (1986–1990)
The Witches and the Grinnygog (1983)

U

UFO (1970-1971)
Ultimate Force (2002-2008, repeated on ITV4 & CBS Action)
Unforgotten (2015–present)
University Challenge (ITV 1962–1987, BBC Two 1994–present)
Up the Elephant and Round the Castle (ITV 1983–1985)
Upstairs, Downstairs (ITV 1971–1975; remake, BBC One 2010–2012)

V

Van der Valk (1972–1977 & 1991–1992, 2020-present)
The Vault (2002–2004)
Vera (2011–present)
The Vice (1999–2003)
Vicious (2013–2016)
Victoria (2016–present)
A Village Affair 
Vincent (2005–2006)
Vital Signs (2006)
The Voice UK  (BBC One 2012–2016; 2017–present)
The Voice Kids (2017–present) 
The Void (2021)

W

Walk The Line (2021)
Warren United (ITV4 2014)
Wheel of Fortune (1988–2001)
The Wheels on the Bus (2006)
Whiplash (1960–1961)
Whitechapel (2009–2013)
White House Farm (2020)
Who Dares, Sings! (2008)
Who Wants to Be a Millionaire? (1998–2014, 2018–present)
The Whole 19 Yards (2010)
Whoops Apocalypse (1982)
Wild at Heart (2006–2012)
Will Shakespeare (1978)
Win, Lose or Draw (1990–2004)
Without Motive (2000–2001)
The Wombles (BBC Two 1973–1975, 1977–2002, 2013–present ITV 1974–2009, 2013–present Channel 4 1982–2004, 2013–present)
World in Action (1963–1998)
Wycliffe (1994–1998)

X

The X Factor (ITV & ITV2 2004–2018)
The X Factor: Celebrity (2019)
The X Factor: The Band (2019)
The XYY Man (1976)

Y

Yakari (1960-1970)
Yanks Go Home (1976–1977)
Yellowthread Street (1990)
You Bet! (1988–1997)
You Don't Know You're Born (2007)
Young Sherlock: The Mystery of the Manor House (1982)
You're Only Young Twice (1977–1981)
Your Face Sounds Familiar (2013)
You've Been Framed! (1990–present) 
Yus, My Dear (1976)

Z

Zevo-3 (1989-1998)
The Zodiac Game (1984–1986)
Zoe Ball on... (2018)
The Zone (2012–present)
Zone of Champions (2019)
The Zoo Gang (1974)
Zoo Vet at Large (1965)

References

ITV
ITV
Television programmes